The Oskaloosa City Park and Band Stand is a nationally recognized historic district located in Oskaloosa, Iowa, United States. It was listed on the National Register of Historic Places in 1983. The listing includes one contributing site and five contributing objects. The town square, which is the site, was part of the original town plat in 1844. Landscaping projects were undertaken in the 1860s, 1911 and 1970–1971. In addition to the landscaping the sidewalks and curbing were installed in 1911. The bandstand in the center was designed by Des Moines architect Frank E. Wetherell, an Oskaloosa native, and built in 1912.

In addition to the bandstand, the other historic objects include the Spanish–American War torpedo; Chief Mahaska sculpture by Fry (1909); Gold Star Mothers' rose bed; and the Women's Relief Corps memorial (1920). It was included in the Oskaloosa City Square Commercial Historic District, which surrounds it, in 1986.

References

Music venues completed in 1912
Music venues in Iowa
Bandstands in the United States
Oskaloosa, Iowa
National Register of Historic Places in Mahaska County, Iowa
Parks on the National Register of Historic Places in Iowa
Historic districts on the National Register of Historic Places in Iowa
Individually listed contributing properties to historic districts on the National Register in Iowa
Historic districts in Mahaska County, Iowa
Event venues on the National Register of Historic Places in Iowa